Natsumi Murakami may refer to:
 , Japanese voice actress
 , a character in Negima! Magister Negi Magi